The 2011 Challenger Banque Nationale de Granby was a professional tennis tournament played on outdoor hard courts. It was the 18th edition, for men, and 1st edition, for women, of the tournament and part of the 2011 ATP Challenger Tour and the 2011 ITF Women's Circuit, offering totals of $50,000, for men, and $25,000, for women, in prize money. It took place in Granby, Quebec, Canada between July 11 and July 17, 2011.

Men's singles main-draw entrants

Seeds

1 Rankings are as of July 4, 2011

Other entrants
The following players received wildcards into the singles main draw:
 Steven Diez
 Kamil Pajkowski
 Milan Pokrajac
 Zachary White

The following player received entry as an alternate:
 Antoine Benneteau

The following players received entry from the qualifying draw:
 Sekou Bangoura
 Jean-François Bérard
 Filip Peliwo
 Yoann Ré

Champions

Men's singles

 Édouard Roger-Vasselin def.  Matthias Bachinger, 7–6(11–9), 4–6, 6–1

Women's singles

 Stéphanie Dubois def.  Zhang Ling, 6–2, 2–6, 6–1

Men's doubles

 Karol Beck /  Édouard Roger-Vasselin def.  Matthias Bachinger /  Frank Moser, 6–1, 6–3

Women's doubles

 Sharon Fichman /  Sun Shengnan def.  Viktoryia Kisialeva /  Nathalia Rossi, 6–4, 6–2

External links
Official website

Challenger Banque Nationale de Granby
Challenger Banque Nationale de Granby
Challenger de Granby
Challenger Banque Nationale de Granby
Challenger Banque Nationale de Granby